Norway was represented by Bobbysocks!, with the song "La det swinge", at the 1985 Eurovision Song Contest, which took place on 4 May in Gothenburg, Sweden. "La det swinge" was chosen as the Norwegian entry at the Melodi Grand Prix on 30 March, and went on to bring Norway a famous first Eurovision victory after decades of being the butt of jokes about their status as Eurovision's perennial also-rans. It was admitted that the lyrics of "La det swinge" had been written with the specific intention of avoiding those Norwegian consonant combinations which had been said to sound harsh in song to non-Scandinavian ears.

Bobbysocks! were Elisabeth Andreassen and Hanne Krogh, who both had previous Eurovision experience – Krogh as a 15-year-old for Norway in 1971 and Andreassen for Sweden in 1982. Both would make further appearances for Norway, Krogh in 1991 and Andreassen in 1994 and 1996.

Before Eurovision

Melodi Grand Prix 1985 
The MGP was held at the Chateau Neuf in Oslo, hosted by Rita Westvik. The staging was now been set in a modern way for accompanying live music for the first time in the history of national final, while the usage of the orchestra were replaced with a live band (e.g. band drums, electric guitars, keyboard synthesizers and horns) and was conducted by Terje Fjærn. Ten songs took part in the final, with the winner chosen by voting from five regional juries and a panel of "experts" consisting of Tony Visconti, Anne Marie David, Stikkan Andersson and Ronnie Hazlehurst. One of the other participants was former three-time Norwegian representative Anita Skorgan.

At Eurovision 
On the night of the final Bobbysocks! performed 13th in the running order, following Italy and preceding the United Kingdom. The voting in 1985 was particularly disparate, with points being spread all across the board to a much greater extent than usual. However at the close of voting "La det swinge" had picked up 123 points, enough for victory by an 18-point margin over runners-up Germany, although the total was and remains the lowest-ever winning score under the 12 points system. "La det swinge" appeared to have sharply divided opinion with the national juries, as it had received an unusually high eight maximum 12 points votes, while the remaining ten juries had awarded it only 27 points between them. The Norwegian jury awarded its 12 points to Sweden.

The congratulations to Bobbysocks! after the victory are fondly remembered for the infamously double-edged remark by Swedish host Lill Lindfors "I must say I'm honestly very happy that this happened, because Norway has been last song so many times that you really deserve it!", prompting much laughter from the audience.

Voting

References

External links 
Full national final on nrk.no

1985
Countries in the Eurovision Song Contest 1985
1985
Eurovision
Eurovision